Solana Beach (Solana, Spanish for "warm wind") is a coastal city in San Diego County, California. Its population was at 12,941 at the 2020 U.S. Census, up from 12,867 at the 2010 Census.

History 
The area was first settled by the San Dieguitos, early Holocene inhabitants of the area. The area was later inhabited by the Kumeyaay, who set up a village they called Kulaumai, on the southern banks of the San Elijo Lagoon. During the Spanish colonial era, trails heading north near Solana Beach crossed inland to avoid the marshes and inlets of the area.

The George H. Jones family were the first European settlers in the area, arriving in 1886. Until 1923, the area had been called Lockwood Mesa. When Lake Hodges Dam was built in 1917–1918, the area began to develop rapidly. The creation of the  Santa Fe Irrigation District in 1918 ensured that the area from Rancho Santa Fe through Solana Beach would prosper and expand. The coastline from Solana Beach to Oceanside began to boom in the early 1920s.  In 1922 Colonel Ed Fletcher, an early community leader and developer, purchased  at $20 per acre from farmer George H. Jones to develop the town of Solana Beach, with the help of his brother-in-law Eugene Batchelder. To provide access to the beach for the development, hydraulic water pressure was used to erode away tons of earth and create the Fletcher Cove entry and beach.  This took one man three months with a fire hose, using water that was coming over the spillway at Lake Hodges Dam.  The beach was opened with great fanfare including horse races on the beach on July 4, 1925.

The community grew slowly, but steadily throughout the rest of the century, with particular booms occurring in the decade after World War II and a real estate boom in the last quarter of the 20th century. In 1986 the community incorporated as the city of Solana Beach.  That year, the city hosted the funeral services for Desi Arnaz, who had died in Del Mar.  Arnaz's funeral was held at St. James Roman Catholic Church, one of two Catholic churches in the city and part of the Diocese of San Diego.

The city received national news coverage in 2003 upon becoming the first city in the Continental United States to enact a smoking ban on its public beaches, a trend which has continued as many other coastal California towns have followed suit in banning smoking on their beaches. Solana Beach was the last coastal community in North San Diego County to ban alcohol on the beach, doing so for at least a year in an action unanimously approved by the City Council.

The group of swimmers reportedly began their swim at Tide Beach Park to the north. Surfers in the area of Fletcher Cover noted harbor seals in the water and a wounded seal on the beach at Fletcher Cove just before the attack, the latter being a typical sign of sharks feeding in the area. Recent increases in the seal population along the Southern California coast — and the seals' tendency to swim in close proximity to human swimmers — are suspected to be contributing factors in the attack.

Eden Gardens 

The neighborhood of La Colonia de Eden Gardens, also known as La Colonia and Eden Gardens, is one of the oldest residential areas of Solana Beach. The community was formed in the 1920s by Mexican farmers who were hired by the owners of large ranches in adjacent Rancho Santa Fe. These farmers wanted their families nearby, hence the formation of La Colonia (the colony). The name Eden Gardens came later from a land developer as a marketing tool. Many residents still refer to the area as La Colonia. Famous residents include Chicano rapper Lil Rob, who was born and raised in the community.

Geography and climate

Before the city incorporated, the county allowed highly concentrated development of large condominiums atop the sandstone bluffs. Geologists studying erosion in period between 1947 and 1977 found little change in the face of the bluffs. It turned out this was a time of very few storms with very little erosion along the coast. The city has had to deal with bluffs collapsing onto the beach and damaging the improvements above. Owners threatened by wave and storm damage to the cliffs have few options.

The Pacific Ocean is to the west; the community of Cardiff-by-the-Sea to the north, and the City of Del Mar to the south.  The unincorporated village of Rancho Santa Fe is located on the east side.

Solana Beach is located at  (32.992937,-117.271135).

Demographics

2010
At the 2010 census Solana Beach had a population of 12,867. The racial makeup of Solana Beach was 11,039 (85.8%) White, 60 (0.5%) African American, 62 (0.5%) Native American, 513 (4.0%) Asian, 19 (0.1%) Pacific Islander, 738 (5.7%) from other races, and 436 (3.4%) from two or more races. Hispanic or Latino of any race were 2,048 persons (15.9%).

The whole population lived in households, no one lived in non-institutionalized group quarters and no one was institutionalized.

There were 5,650 households, 1,323 (23.4%) had children under the age of 18 living in them, 2,730 (48.3%) were opposite-sex married couples living together, 360 (6.4%) had a female householder with no husband present, 193 (3.4%) had a male householder with no wife present.  There were 325 (5.8%) unmarried opposite-sex partnerships, and 42 (0.7%) same-sex married couples or partnerships. 1,745 households (30.9%) were one person and 647 (11.5%) had someone living alone who was 65 or older. The average household size was 2.28.  There were 3,283 families (58.1% of households); the average family size was 2.85.

The age distribution was 2,378 people (18.5%) under the age of 18, 738 people (5.7%) aged 18 to 24, 3,518 people (27.3%) aged 25 to 44, 3,829 people (29.8%) aged 45 to 64, and 2,404 people (18.7%) who were 65 or older.  The median age was 43.7 years. For every 100 females, there were 97.5 males.  For every 100 females age 18 and over, there were 95.3 males.

There were 6,540 housing units at an average density of 1,804.7 per square mile, of the occupied units 3,401 (60.2%) were owner-occupied and 2,249 (39.8%) were rented. The homeowner vacancy rate was 1.4%; the rental vacancy rate was 6.3%.  7,919 people (61.5% of the population) lived in owner-occupied housing units and 4,948 people (38.5%) lived in rental housing units.

2000
At the 2000 census there were 12,979 people in 5,754 households, including 3,279 families, in the city. The population density was 3,678.7 inhabitants per square mile (1,419.6/km). The racial makeup of the city was 87.01% White, 0.50% African American, 0.42% Native American, 3.46% Asian, 0.14% Pacific Islander, 5.59% from other races, and 2.89% from two or more races. Hispanic or Latino of any race were 14.81%.

Of the 5,754 households 20.8% had children under the age of 18 living with them, 47.3% were married couples living together, 6.8% had a female head of household, and 43.0% were non-families. 31.5% of households were one person and 10.4% were one person aged 65 or older.  The average household size was 2.25 and the average family size was 2.83.

The age distribution was 17.9% under the age of 18, 6.5% from 18 to 24, 30.9% from 25 to 44, 27.4% from 45 to 64, and 17.3% 65 or older.  The median age was 42 years. For every 100 females, there were 97.1 males.  For every 100 females age 18 and over, there were 94.5 males.

The median household income was $71,774 and the median family income  was $96,652. Males had a median income of $72,028 versus $41,186 for females. The per capita income for the city was $48,547.  About 3.4% of families and 6.7% of the population were below the poverty line, including 7.5% of those under age 18 and 5.2% of those age 65 or over.

Current estimates 
According to estimates by the San Diego Association of Governments, the median household income of Solana Beach in 2005 was $101,122 (not adjusted for inflation).  When adjusted for inflation (1999 dollars; comparable to Census data above), the median household income was $82,114.

Economy 
The Cedros Design District is located in Solana Beach, and consists of more than 85 art galleries, import and antique stores, boutiques and cafes. The Design District is also home to the Solana Beach Farmers Market, which operates every Sunday from 12pm to 4pm and offers locally grown fresh cut flowers, baked goods, organic produce and veggies. Another prominent venue on Cedros Avenue is the Belly Up, a live music space operating since 1974.

The headquarters of Nisus Software, developers of the Nisus Writer word processor for the Apple Macintosh, are located in Solana Beach.

Government
Solana Beach is a general-law city operating under a Council-Manager form of government. The City Council serves as a legislative body and consists of five Council members, one of whom is chosen to act as Mayor for a one-year term on a rotating basis.

In the state legislature, Solana Beach is located in: 
39th California State Senate District, represented by Democrat Toni Atkins.
78th California State Assembly District, represented by Democrat Todd Gloria.

The district has a Cook Partisan Voting Index of R+1.

Education 
Solana Beach is served by the Solana Beach School District and the San Dieguito Union High School District.

High schools
Public high schools serving the area are Canyon Crest Academy, San Dieguito Academy, and Torrey Pines High School. Santa Fe Christian Schools is a private school serving ages K-12.

Middle school
 Earl Warren Middle School

Elementary schools
 Skyline Elementary School
 Solana Vista Elementary School

Transportation
Solana Beach is served by Amtrak's Pacific Surfliner and Coaster commuter rail at Solana Beach station. Interstate 5 is a major freeway bisecting the community.

Notable people

George Brent, actor
Jim Dennis, Hall of Fame harness racing driver
Patrick J. Hannifin, United States Navy Vice admiral
Patti Page, singer
Lil Rob, rapper

References

External links
 Official city website 

 
Cities in San Diego County, California
North County (San Diego County)
Populated coastal places in California
San Diego metropolitan area
Incorporated cities and towns in California
Populated places established in 1986
1986 establishments in California
Managed retreat